Trupanea terryi is a species of tephritid or fruit flies in the genus Trupanea of the family Tephritidae.

Distribution
Indonesia.

References

Tephritinae
Insects described in 1988
Diptera of Asia